Paolo Pittino (born 2 February 1968) is an Italian lightweight rower. He won a gold medal at the 1999 World Rowing Championships in St. Catharines with the lightweight men's coxless pair.

References

1968 births
Living people
Italian male rowers
World Rowing Championships medalists for Italy